"Lille katt" (English: Little cat) is a Swedish children's song. The lyrics were written by the author Astrid Lindgren. The music was composed by Georg Riedel.

It appears in the 1972 film Nya hyss av Emil i Lönneberga.

Publication
Barnvisboken, 1977, as "Lille katt, lille kat" ("Lilla Idas visa")
Smått å Gott, 1977
Barnvisor och sånglekar till enkelt komp, 1984

Recordings
An early recording was done on 1971 album Astrid Lindgrens Emil i Lönneberga. The song has also been recorded by Lisa Nilsson (1999)  and Siw Malmkvist and Tove Malmkvist The song was also recorded by Wooffisarna & Lill-Babs on 1980 album Wooffisarna & Lill-Babs. In 1991, the song was recorded in Persian by Simin Habibi, as "Gurba-ji kucik".

German singer-songwriter Lena Meyer-Landrut recorded Lille katt for her third studio album Stardust in 2012 as a hidden track.

References

External links
 Lille Katt on YouTube

1972 in Sweden
1972 songs
Film music
Swedish children's songs
Songs about cats
Songs with lyrics by Astrid Lindgren
Songs with music by Georg Riedel (jazz musician)
Lena Meyer-Landrut songs